Penrhos is derived from the Welsh words pen ("head" or "top") and rhos ("moorland"). It may refer to:
 Places
Penrhos, Anglesey, a village in Wales
 Penrhos Country Park (AKA Penrhos Coastal Park), a country park near Penrhos, Anglesey
Penrhos, Gwynedd, Wales, a village and former civil parish
RAF Penrhos, a former Royal Air Force airfield near Penrhos, Gwynedd
Penrhos, Herefordshire, England, an area or hamlet at the top of the hill east of Kington, Herefordshire near the Welsh border
Penrhos, Monmouthshire, Wales, a village in the community of Llantilio Crossenny in Monmouthshire
Penrhos, Powys, Wales
 Penrhos Cottage, a very small cottage situated to the south east of Maenclochog, Pembrokeshire, Wales
 Organisations
Penrhos College, Perth, an independent school for girls in Western Australia
 Rydal Penrhos, an independent co-educational boarding school in Colwyn Bay, North Wales
 People
 Cledwyn Hughes, Baron Cledwyn of Penrhos (19162001), Welsh politician
 Transport
 Penhros Junction, a railway junction and part of the Barry Railway Company lines.

See also 
 Penrose (disambiguation)